Dorset Street may refer to:
 Dorset Street (Spitalfields), the site of the murder of Mary Jane Kelly by Jack the Ripper
 Dorset Street, Dublin, Ireland